D-Body can refer to:
 1957-1973 Imperial (automobile)
 1990-1998 Chrysler D platform